Tyson Sexsmith (born March 19, 1989) is a Canadian former professional ice hockey goaltender. Sexsmith was selected by the San Jose Sharks in the 3rd round (91st overall) of the 2007 NHL Entry Draft.  During his major junior career with the Vancouver Giants, Sexsmith has won a President's Cup as Western Hockey League (WHL) champions in 2005–06 and a Memorial Cup in 2007.  He is the WHL's all-time shutout record holder with 26 in his four-year career.

Playing career
Sexsmith made his major junior debut in the WHL during the 2004–05 season, playing a total of three games with the Medicine Hat Tigers and Vancouver Giants.  After playing in the backup position with the Giants the next season, Sexsmith emerged as the starting goalie in  2006–07 after a goaltending controversy early in the season with Dustin Slade.  Slade, who had led the team to a Memorial Cup appearance in 2006, began splitting time with Sexsmith, who, with his comparable play, began challenging Slade's starting position.  Consequentially, Slade left the team to seek a professional career, leaving Sexsmith as the undisputed starter.

Sexsmith would go on to complete the season as the league's leader in goals-against-average and would backstop the Giants to their first Memorial Cup.  After his Memorial Cup win, Sexsmith was drafted 91st overall (3rd round) in the 2007 NHL Entry Draft by the San Jose Sharks.  He was the first WHL goalie to be taken in the draft that year.

Returning to the Giants upon being drafted, Sexsmith earned an invite to Team Canada's national junior selection camp for the 2008 World Junior Championships.  Although he was not selected, Sexsmith went on to lead the WHL in goals-against-average (1.89) for a second straight season, as well as in shutouts, with 9.  He was named to the WHL's Second All-Star Team, however the Giants were eliminated in the second round by the eventual 2008 Memorial Cup champions, the Spokane Chiefs.

Near the beginning of the 2008–09 season, Sexsmith recorded his 22nd WHL shutout on November 7, 2008, in a 5-0 win against the Prince George Cougars, passing Bryan Bridges and Leland Irving as the all-time WHL leader in shutouts.  The next week, he was named CHL Goaltender of the Week on November 11.  Sexsmith finished his third WHL season with a 2.26 GAA and 6 shutouts to give him 26 overall in his WHL career.  During the playoffs, Sexsmith earned his second CHL Goaltender of the Week recognition on April 21, 2009, after shutting the Spokane Chiefs out in the seventh game of the second round, then splitting the first two games of the semi-finals against the Kelowna Rockets.

After finishing Juniors, Sexsmith would play three seasons in the San Jose Sharks organization before bouncing between the KHL, the HCB South Tyrol of the Italian Series A hockey league and the Abbotsford Heat. He has not played in a professional game since the end of the 2012-2013 season.

Personal life
Sexsmith was born in Priddis, Alberta, to Tim and Rawn Sexsmith on March 19, 1989.

Awards
Won the President's Cup as WHL champions with the Vancouver Giants in 2006.
Won the Memorial Cup as CHL champions with the Vancouver Giants in 2007.
Named to the WHL West Second All-Star Team in 2008.
Named CHL Goaltender of the Week on November 11, 2008, and April 21, 2009.

Records
WHL league record; most shutouts, career - 26 (surpassed Bryan Bridges and Leland Irving, 21, on November 7, 2008)

Career statistics

Regular season

Playoffs

References

External links

1989 births
Canadian ice hockey goaltenders
Metallurg Novokuznetsk players
Kalamazoo Wings (ECHL) players
Living people
Medicine Hat Tigers players
San Jose Sharks draft picks
Stockton Thunder players
Vancouver Giants players
Worcester Sharks players